Mallian Kalan is a village tehsil Nakodar  Jalandhar district in the Indian state of Punjab.Kalan is Persian language word which means Big and Khurd is Persian word which means small when two villages have same name then it is distinguished with Kalan means Big and Khurd means Small used with Village Name.

The village is almost 431 km from Delhi, 33 km from Jalandhar 9 km from Nakodar and about 103 km from Amritsar. Surrounding villages include Talwandi Salem,  Jahangir, Kang Sahib Rai, Mallian Khurd, Heran, Husainpur, Gill, Nur Pur Chatha, Ugghi and Khanpur Dhadda. The Town is of considerable antiquity and had been held in succession by three different generations and then by the Hindu, traces of whom still exist in the extensive ruins by which the town is surrounded

Schools in Mallian Kalan
Govt. Sen. Sec School
Govt. Elementary School

Popular religious places
Singh Sabha Gurudwara
Darghaa Baba Sarfree Ji

Games in the village

Cricket
Football 
Kabbadi
Volleyball.

Villages in Jalandhar district
Villages in Nakodar tehsil